Lemophagus is a genus of ichneumon wasps in the family Ichneumonidae. There are about eight described species in Lemophagus.

Species
These eight species belong to the genus Lemophagus:
 Lemophagus amurensis Kasparyan & Dbar, 1985 c g
 Lemophagus crioceritor Aubert, 1986 c g
 Lemophagus curtus Townes, 1965 c g b
 Lemophagus diversae Kusigemati, 1972 c g
 Lemophagus errabundus (Gravenhorst, 1829) c g
 Lemophagus foersteri (Tschek, 1871) c g
 Lemophagus japonicus (Sonan, 1930) c g
 Lemophagus pulcher (Szepligeti, 1916) c
Data sources: i = ITIS, c = Catalogue of Life, g = GBIF, b = Bugguide.net

References

Further reading

External links

 

Campopleginae